Monsters HD was a 24-hours-a-day, seven-days-a-week, linear horror film and monster movie network. It was launched on October 1, 2003, in the United States and premiered exclusively on the Voom DTH satellite platform, owned by Cablevision.  The home theatre webzine, Widescreen Review, alluded to Voom's Monsters HD as having "the largest collection of HD Horror films" when Echostar's Dish Network picked up Rainbow Media's Voom Suite of High Definition Channels.        
Rainbow Media's AMC Network  and its annual October "Monsterfest" (now known as "Fear Fest") programming of horror films served as the springboard and promotional platform for the launch of Monsters HD.     Monsters HD commissioned the digital restoration of its film library, bringing them to high definition, and presented world television premieres of films like the Director's Cut of the Stuart Gordon film version of H.P. Lovecraft's From Beyond.

High Definition Horror: Restoration and Remastering

In an interview with Video Watchdog editor Tim Lucas, Monsters HD's David Sehring reflected on the restoration and high definition process, "As you know, Monsters HD's tagline is 'It's Alive!' We really take that to heart as we remaster films, like From Beyond." For its 25th Anniversary issue, the Horror magazine Fangoria  featured additional interviews with Monsters HD's senior vice president of acquisitions and programming, David Sehring, and creative director, Jason Bylan at their Rainbow Media Offices in New York City for an article entitled "The New Future of Fear: Meet 13 Rising Talents Who Promise To Keep Us Terrified For The Next 25 Years ". On the topic of Monsters HD's initiative to restore and remaster films in the high definition format, Sehring related, "With Monsters HD, you're going to see more movies that have been recently transferred from 35mm interpositives or negatives. We've been going back to all the studios, which is obviously a very labor intensive process because it's all brand new. They don't even have a format established for the HD DVD market yet. It's always a challenge to work with  something that's still being developed. Monsters HD's Bylan added "We want people to go to hi-def, because that's the way television's going. That's why we made it, to present Octaman or The Boogens in HD. A lot of people aren't realizing what they're missing until they see it." Bylan also noted, "You can see the wires on Rodan much clearer now." In the April 2005 issue of Video Watchdog, The Perfectionist's Guide to Fantastic Video editor Tim Lucas praised the horror and creature feature channel by noting  that "Monsters HD continues to thrill with spectacular high definition masters of movies which can't be found on disc or anywhere else."

Film Acquisitions, Programming and Scheduling:  Zombiethons to Killer Toy Stories

For its May 2006 issue, the Canadian horror publication Rue Morgue featured a cover story on the Monsters HD network reporting that the channel also "aired the world television premiere of Bubba Ho Tep and broadcast a wide range of beloved classics like The Evil Dead, The Texas Chain Saw Massacre, Tombs of the Blind Dead, The Tingler, The Abominable Dr. Phibes, Scanners and others, all presented in 5.1 sound, uncut and completely commercial free. Rue Morgue also noted that Monsters HD managed to secure licensing deals with all the major studios -- Paramount and their Friday the 13th franchise, MGM (which includes Sam Arkoff's  AIP drive-in classics from Roger Corman), New Line's (post Paramount) Friday the 13th movies as well as the 2003 version of The Texas Chainsaw Massacre, the Universal horror classics, Sony/Columbia's Ray Harryhausen stop-motion monster films and oddball titles like Octaman and Joe Giannone's Madman. Monsters HD's curation of horror films for 2006 were presented in Rue Morgue's "TV Terror Guide", which cited the channel's monthly marathons, weekly film festivals including thematic programming stunts like May's "Monsters Mother's Day" featuring Larry Cohen's It's Alive trilogy; August's  "Jawsfest" featuring the first four Jaws films; September's "Zombiethon" featuring George Romero's Night of the Living Dead, Dawn of the Dead, and Day of the Dead; November's "Monsters Goes Ape" featuring King Kong (1933), Son of Kong, Mighty Joe Young and King Kong (1976); and a Christmas schedule of "Killer Toy Stories" featuring films from the Child's Play and Puppet Master franchises." Monsters HD's program stunts for 2006 and 2007 also  included a July  "Japanese Giant Kaiju Fest" featuring various Godzilla films from Toho and an October schedule featuring four titles from the Hellraiser film series and a Halloween marathon of six titles from the Halloween franchise.

Original productions: Monsterama, Gruesome Twosomes & Tales From The Crypt

Monsters HD also aired several original productions, including a series focusing on different genre celebrities, special effects artists, monster movie props and creature collectibles hosted by Elvira, Mistress of the Dark, (Cassandra Peterson), entitled "Monsterama." Tim Lucas, editor of the publication Video Watchdog, noted that "This show was clearly put together by people who know this stuff, and it is always a treat to watch."  Some of the Monsterama highlights included in Video Watchdog: A Profile of B-Movie Monster Maker Paul Blaisdell, featuring clips from his hard-to-see home made movie The Cliff Monster and vintage creature effects test footage from his AIP films; an episode on B-Monster movie authority Bob Burns III including a brief tour of his collection and home movie footage of his renowned Halloween shows in Burbank, California; a look back at TV Horror Hosts from Vampira to Zacherle to Elvira and hosted by series producer and character actor Daniel Roebuck in Horror Host makeup; a visit to the crowded apartment of a Godzilla toy collector; segments devoted to Monster artist Basil Gogos, Famous Monsters of Filmland editor and collector Forrest Ackerman; the K.N.B. EFK special effects team; and Monster movie maker Rick Baker (makeup artist) whose in-house museum is described by Video Watchdog's Tim Lucas as "eye-popping in HD. " TV Guide.com lists other episodes in the series including segments on Creature from the Black Lagoon collectibles; McFarlane Toys featuring an interview with comic book artist Todd McFarlane; Horror attraction The Witches Dungeon; Don Post Masks; Sideshow Collectibles movie monster toys; and the Monster Model kits from Aurora Plastics Corporation.

Monsters HD's other productions included a series of suggestive video "comic strip" vignettes called  "Gruesome Twosomes", featuring comic book cover artwork by Mike Hoffman, which was later released by the artist in a portfolio called 'Ghastly Gals",  and two, live-action, scantily clad females disrobing while "keyed in" to "green screen" thematic horror and monster comic book settings. Monsters HD's Gruesome Twosome comic strips continue to air in their censored form on YouTube under the user name "MonstersHD", and were described on the website Best-Horror-Movies.com as "horror themed burlesque segments that aired uncensored between movies in the early morning hours."

Monsters HD also aired an original one-hour production from director Chip Selby and CS Films, on the Tales from the Crypt comic and television series entitled Tales From The Crypt: From Comic Books to Television, which premiered on October 17, 2004 at the Screamfest Horror Film Festival in Los Angeles, California. and later screened on the Monsters HD channel on October 24, 2004.  The documentary was described by the website Horrortalk.com as an "in depth look at EC, from its difficult beginnings to its tragic ending and the decency hearing that caused it."

Promotional campaigns: "It's Alive!" and "See The Good Parts"

Monsters HD's animated "on-air" launch package and logos were designed, created and produced by creative ad agency mOcean. In an article for HiDef.com, mOcean creative director Steve Kazanjian noted that the inspiration for Monsters HD's animation package came from the key art of vintage genre posters hanging in their office.  According to Kanzanjian, "Monsters HD focused on using the HD platform: emphasizing subtle color variations, fine point lines and 5.1 stereo surround sound. Using a combination of 2D compositing, 3D character animation and hand drawn illustration, mOcean developed modern poster interpretations of classic monster themes such as 'Destruction Outer Space", 'The Island That Time Forgot', The Demented Psychopath's Lair' and a classic 'Southern Cemetery'. The imagery helped reinforce the network's tagline – 'It's Alive!' -with all new animation, as each poster actually "comes alive" through visual moves."

In 2004, Monsters HD and web developer Sudden Industries, created an on-line "It's Alive! Monsters HD Sweepstakes" campaign to promote the horror and creature feature channel and the VOOM Satellite Service. On-line digital trading cards, with sound and animation, depicting classic monster highlights were distributed to various genre websites and the horror community to engage potential entrants for a chance to win a set of limited edition Arkoff monster figures, an HDTV set and a subscription to Voom.

Monsters HD also had an on-air campaign called "See The Good Parts".  Monsters HD's Greg Heim was noted in an article by Best-Horror-Movies.com as having created many of the promotions that "advertised a movie that was airing on the channel by showing an iconic part from the film, cutting to a graphic with the words 'See the Good Parts', and then continuing the scene.   To promote John Carpenter's The Thing, the promotion featured the famous chest-alien teeth scene, cut to the "See the Good Parts" graphic after the arms had been bitten off, and then proceeded to show the rest of the scene including the Thing leaping out the chest, the spider head crawling across the floor, and then the torching of the creature. Monsters HD would then let you know when the film would be airing.  With the 1974 version of The Texas Chain Saw Massacre, the ad was shorter:  Monsters HD showed Leatherface's first appearance, cutting to the "See the Good Parts" graphic just after the bludgeoning of the victim and cutting back to show Leatherface slamming the metal door shut."

Branding and marketing: 1950s Horror Comics & Bernie Wrightson

Monsters HD commissioned genre artist and Swamp Thing co-creator Bernie Wrightson "to design their EC Comics-style image spots and brand." Horror writer and fellow Swamp Thing comic book artist Stephen R. Bissette noted on his blog Myrant  "Wrightson's fun riff on the Jack Kamen EC inspired Creepshow film poster as well as "Wrightson's 'Eye Want You!' parody of the famous Flagg Uncle Sam recruitment poster" which Monsters HD used to introduce a skeletal Frankenstien Zombie character named "Uncle Samhain." Monsters HD announced Wrightson's Uncle Samhain character at the San Diego Comic Con in July 2006 with the character artwork appearing on branded T-shirts, advertisements and web banners heralding Monsters HD's user-generated video series called "American Monstar." On October 30 and 31, 2006, the Uncle Samhain character appeared in an animated "American Monstar" promotional spot which ran in over 150 movie theatres across the United States with a special Monsters HD presentation of the John Carpenter horror classic Halloween.

Merchandising: Monsters HD Action Figures and DVDs 

Monsters HD also has a boutique line of action figures, produced in association with Executive Replicas and Amok Time, which were reviewed by collector and Fangoria.com contributor Mike Koopmans who noted, "I'm most impressed by the Monsters HD line. It's not so much the quality and detail that tickles me so; it's the odd choice of characters." Prototypes of Monsters HD's Uncle Samhain character and Frankenstien Meets The Space Monster appeared at the New York Toy Fair in 2008, but only the creature from Horror of Party Beach and the teenage vampire girl from Blood of Dracula were produced and continue to be sold.

Another marketing and merchandising effort was created for Monsters HD by Dark Sky Films and MPI Home Video, as well as Lions Gate Entertainment,  who continue to release and sell a boutique DVD line of Horror and Drive-In Double Feature discs showcasing Monsters HD's owned and remastered films.Monsters HD's DVD label includes the Del Tenney films Horror of Party Beach and Curse of the Living Corpse, and Violent Midnight; Frankenstein Meets The Space Monster; The Flesh Eaters: Horror Hospital; Slaughter of the Vampires; Blood of the Vampire; Creation of the Humanoids; Prince of Space; Terror Beneath The Sea and Invasion of the Neptune Men (both starring Sonny Chiba); Werewolves on Wheels; the Amicus classics And Now The Screaming Starts, The Beast Must Die and Asylum starring Peter Cushing; The Devil's Rain starring Ernest Borgnine and William Shatner; and Magic starring Anthony Hopkins and Ann-Margret; the Samuel Arkoff American International Pictures: The She Creature, Earth vs The Spider, War of the Colossal Beast, The Day The World Ended, Blood of Dracula; How To Make A Monster; and others.

Litigation: Voom HD Networks vs Echostar Satellite

After Cablevision's sale of the Voom Satellite Service in 2005 to Echostar Communications for Dish Network, Monsters HD ran on the satellite provider as part of a Rainbow Media distribution deal of Voom channels with Echostar Communications. Citing low viewership of the Voom suite of channels and breach of contract relating to contractual obligations with Rainbow's Voom programming expenditures, Dish removed Monsters HD and the balance of the VOOM channels in 2008, which, in turn, resulted in a $2.4 billion lawsuit filed against Dish Network by Cablevison and AMC Networks, fka Rainbow Media Holdings, LLC.. Petitions were formed to save the Monsters HD channel as it continued to air on Cablevision systems, but were unsuccessful with Monsters HD and the rest of the Voom channels ceasing operations in the United States on January 20, 2009. Eventually, AMC Networks and Cablevision's litigation with Dish Network for breach of contract relating to carriage termination of Monsters HD and fourteen additional Voom HD channels ended, with a proposed settlement announced on October 21, 2012.

References

See also
 Monster movie
 Voom HD Networks

Movie channels
Defunct television networks in the United States
Television channels and stations established in 2003
2003 establishments in the United States
Television channels and stations disestablished in 2009
2009 disestablishments in the United States
AMC Networks
HD-only channels